Chrysopilus connexus is a species of snipe fly in the family Rhagionidae.

Distribustion
United States

References

Rhagionidae
Insects described in 1912
Diptera of North America